Teagan Berry (born 20 May 2002) is an Australian rugby league footballer who plays as a er for the St George Illawarra Dragons in the NRL Women's Premiership

Background
Born and raised in Oak Flats, New South Wales, Tegan attended Oak Flats Primary and High school. Tegan has a twin sister Olivia and an older brother Jackson. Berry began playing rugby league in 2018 for the Shellharbour Stingrays.

Playing career
In 2019, Berry joined the Illawarra Steelers Tarsha Gale Cup side, scoring two tries in their 24–12 Grand Final win over the Newcastle Knights.

2020
In 2020, Berry began the season playing for the Steelers in the Tarsha Gale Cup. On 24 September, Berry joined the St George Illawarra Dragons NRL Women's Premiership team.

In Round 3 of the 2020 NRL Women's season, she made her debut for the Dragons, scoring a try and kicking a goal in a 10–22 loss to the New Zealand Warriors.

References

External links
St George Illawarra Dragons profile

2002 births
Living people
Australian female rugby league players
Rugby league wingers
St. George Illawarra Dragons (NRLW) players